Brad Anderson (born April 5, 1964) is an American film director, producer and writer. A director of thriller and horror films and television projects, he is best known for having directed The Machinist (2004), starring Christian Bale, psychological horror film Session 9 (2001) and The Call (2013), starring Halle Berry. He also produced and directed several installments of the Fox science fiction television series Fringe. Early in his career, he directed the romantic comedies Next Stop Wonderland (1998) and Happy Accidents (2000).

Biography

Early life 
Anderson was born in Madison, Connecticut, the son of Pamela Taylor Anderson, a community services administrator. He is the nephew of Emmy Award-winning actress Holland Taylor. Before he began his film career, he attended Bowdoin College, where he majored in anthropology and Russian. He then went to London to finish his film education at London Film School before returning to Boston.

Film career 
Anderson started out writing and directing the romantic comedies The Darien Gap (1996), Next Stop Wonderland (1998) and Happy Accidents (2000), all of which premiered at the Sundance Film Festival.

His next film was the 2001 psychological horror film Session 9. Unsuccessful at the box office, the film has since gained a cult following. In 2002, Anderson was a member of the dramatic jury at the Sundance Film Festival.

This was followed by his most notable work to date, The Machinist (2004), starring Christian Bale. The film became well-known for Bales' dramatic weight loss (62 pounds) for the lead role, and for its screenplay, written by Scott Kosar.

His next two films were TransSiberian (2008), a thriller starring Woody Harrelson, Emily Mortimer and Ben Kingsley and the horror film Vanishing on 7th Street (2010), starring Hayden Christensen, John Leguizamo and Thandiwe Newton. Notably, both TransSiberian and The Machinist were funded by Anglo-German production companies.

At one point, he was also one of the candidates to direct the sequel to Paranormal Activity.

In 2013, Anderson directed The Call, a thriller starring Halle Berry and Abigail Breslin.

This was followed by Stonehearst Asylum (aka Eliza Graves) in 2014, with Kate Beckinsale, Jim Sturgess, David Thewlis and Ben Kingsley in the leading roles.

In 2018, Anderson directed the espionage thriller Beirut, which stars Jon Hamm and Rosamund Pike, and in 2019, he directed the Netflix thriller film Fractured, starring Sam Worthington, Lily Rabe, Stephen Tobolowsky and Adjoa Andoh, which was released on October 11.

Television work 
Anderson has directed numerous episodes of Fringe, as well as two episodes each of The Wire, The Killing, and Boardwalk Empire.

Anderson was one of the contributors to the horror series Masters of Horror, directing the season two episode "Sounds Like".

Anderson directed the pilot episode of the ABC prime time series Forever.

He also directed the pilot episode of CBS's Zoo.

Anderson directed episodes of Clickbait for Netflix.

Future projects 
Anderson replaced Joseph Ruben as director of Bold Films thriller Jack in May 2010, and cast John Cusack for the lead, who has since been replaced by Liev Schreiber. Anderson was supposed to direct The Living and the Dead, based on the novel of the same name by Robert Tinnell and Todd Livingston.

After working together on The Machinist, Anderson and Christian Bale have had plans to collaborate again on an adaptation of J. G. Ballard's novel Concrete Island.

Filmography
Film

Television

References

External links 
 
 

1964 births
American television directors
Bowdoin College alumni
Living people
People from Madison, Connecticut
Film directors from Connecticut
Alumni of the London Film School